Fürst Bismarck (Prince Bismarck) may refer to:

 , German armored cruiser of World War One
 , German battlecruiser of the planned , canceled before completion
 , German ocean liner, Hamburg-America Line (HAPAG)
 , German ocean liner, Hamburg-America Line (HAPAG)
 Fürst Bismarck, a brand of the German liquor Kornbrand

See also
 Otto von Bismarck (1815–1898), Prussian statesman who dominated German and European affairs
 Bismarck (disambiguation)

Ship names